Joe's Bed-Stuy Barbershop: We Cut Heads is a 1983 student film by American filmmaker Spike Lee. Lee submitted the film as his master's degree thesis at the Tisch School of the Arts.

Production
Lee's classmates Ang Lee and Ernest R. Dickerson worked on the film as assistant director and cinematographer, respectively. The film was the first student film to be showcased in Lincoln Center's New Directors New Films Festival. Lee's father, Bill Lee, composed the score. The film won a Student Academy Award.

Plot
The film is set in a Bedford–Stuyvesant, Brooklyn barbershop where customers come to hang out, discuss various issues, and get a haircut. The manager, Zack, took over after Joe was killed by a gangster who used the shop as a front for a numbers racket. Zack wants to keep the shop legitimate but the gangster wants to continue the deal he had with Joe.

See also
American Taboo-another student film that also won the Student Academy Award the same year as Spike's film
1983 in film

References

External links
 
 

1983 films
1980s crime films
American comedy-drama films
American crime comedy films
American independent films
Films directed by Spike Lee
Films set in Brooklyn
Films with screenplays by Spike Lee
American student films
1983 comedy-drama films
African-American films
Student Academy Award winners
Films about hairdressers
1980s English-language films
1980s American films